Lomatium vaginatum is a species of flowering plant in the carrot family known by the common name broadsheath desertparsley. It is native to northern California and adjacent sections of Oregon and Nevada on the Modoc Plateau. It grows in sagebrush, woodland, and other local habitat. This is a perennial herb growing up to 45 centimeters long from a thick taproot. The leaf blades are divided and subdivided into narrow segments. Leaves higher on the stem are enclosed in sheaths. The inflorescence is an umbel of yellow flowers.

External links
Jepson Manual Treatment
USDA Plants Profile
Photo gallery

vaginatum
Flora of California
Flora of Nevada
Flora of Oregon
Flora of the Great Basin
~
Endemic flora of the United States
Taxa named by John Merle Coulter
Flora without expected TNC conservation status